Edward de Veaux Morrell (August 7, 1863 – September 1, 1917) was a Republican member of the U.S. House of Representatives from Pennsylvania.

Early life
Morrell was born in Newport, Rhode Island on August 7, 1863.  He was the son of Edward Morrell and Ida Alicia (née Powel) Morrell.

He attended private schools and graduated from the University of Pennsylvania, where he was a member of St. Anthony Hall, in 1885.  He studied law at the University of Pennsylvania Law School, was admitted to the bar in 1887 and commenced practice in Philadelphia.  He was a member of the select council of Philadelphia from 1891 to 1894.  He was active in the Pennsylvania National Guard, serving as a colonel of the Third Regiment and brigadier general commanding the First Brigade.

Career
Morrell was elected as a Republican to the Fifty-sixth Congress to fill the vacancy caused by the death of Alfred C. Harmer.  He was reelected to the Fifty-seventh, Fifty-eighth, and Fifty-ninth Congresses.  He served as chairman of the House United States House Committee on the Militia during the Fifty-eighth and Fifty-ninth Congresses. In 1904, he delivered a speech defending the Fourteenth and Fifteenth Amendment from Democrats' polemics against it.  He was not a candidate for renomination in 1906.

He established the first telephone line north of the Frankford section of Philadelphia, and built an electric-light plant there.  He was a member of the board of education of Philadelphia from 1912 to 1916.

Personal life
In 1889, he was married to Louise Bouvier Drexel (1863 –1945), daughter of Francis Anthony Drexel and niece of Anthony J. Drexel, the most influential financier in the U.S. in the nineteenth century.  Louise's mother, Emma Bouvier, was the aunt of John Vernou Bouvier, Jr., U.S. First Lady Jacqueline Kennedy Onassis's paternal grandfather. Louise's half-sister was canonized as Saint Katharine Drexel on October 1, 2000 by Pope John Paul II.

He was a resident of the Torresdale section of Philadelphia.  He later went to Colorado Springs, Colorado, for his health, and died there in 1917.  He interred in the family crypt at Eden Hall in Torresdale.

References

Further reading

Edward Morrell at The Political Graveyard

External links

Morrell's Torresdale home

1863 births
1917 deaths
University of Pennsylvania alumni
Politicians from Philadelphia
Republican Party members of the United States House of Representatives from Pennsylvania
School board members in Pennsylvania
19th-century American politicians
University of Pennsylvania Law School alumni